Mbali Dawn Hlophe is a South African politician. She has served as the Member of the Executive Council (MEC) for Social Development, Agriculture and Rural Development in Gauteng since October 2022. She had previously served as the MEC for Sport, Arts, Culture and Recreation from May 2019 to October 2022. A member of the African National Congress, she has been a Member of the Gauteng Provincial Legislature since May 2019.

Early life and education
Hlophe was born in Soweto in South Africa's former Transvaal Province. Her father worked as a priest at the Old Apostolic Church. She matriculated from Parktown Girls High School and studied at the University of the Witwatersrand.

Political career
Hlophe served as the president of the student representative council at Wits. She was also a member of the provincial executive committee of the African National Congress Youth League for two consecutive terms and its spokesperson.

At the provincial election held on 8 May 2019, she was elected to the Gauteng Provincial Legislature as an ANC representative, and was sworn in as an MPL on 22 May. On 29 May, premier David Makhura announced his executive council. Hlophe was appointed MEC responsible for the provincial Department of Sport, Arts, Culture and Recreation. She was sworn in the following day.

On 7 October 2022, Hlophe was appointed Social Development MEC in the executive council led by the newly-elected premier Panyaza Lesufi.

References

External links

Living people
Year of birth missing (living people)
People from Gauteng
People from Soweto
African National Congress politicians
Members of the Gauteng Provincial Legislature
21st-century South African politicians
University of the Witwatersrand alumni